"Diamond Teeth Samurai" is a song by American rapper YoungBoy Never Broke Again  and the second single from his debut studio album Until Death Call My Name (2018). It was released to streaming services on April 2, 2018 along with its music video, and interpolates "Tha Block Is Hot" by Lil Wayne. YoungBoy previously previewed the track in late 2017.

Charts

Certifications

References 

2018 singles
2018 songs
YoungBoy Never Broke Again songs
Songs written by Lil Wayne
Songs written by Mannie Fresh
Songs written by Juvenile (rapper)
Atlantic Records singles
Songs written by YoungBoy Never Broke Again